is a passenger railway station located in the town of Kuroshio, Hata District, Kōchi Prefecture, Japan. It is operated by the Tosa Kuroshio Railway and has the station number "TK28".

Lines and Trains
Only local trains stop at the station.

Layout
The station consists of a side platform serving a single track on a side hill cutting. There is no station building and the station is unstaffed. A shelter is provided on the platform for waiting passengers. A bike shed has been set up near the station entrance.

Adjacent stations

History
After the privatization of JNR, control of the station passed to Tosa Kuroshio Railway on 1 April 1988.

Passenger statistics
In fiscal 2019, the station was used by an average of 19 passengers daily.

Surrounding area
Japan National Route 56
Kuroshio Municipal Kennokawa Elementary School

See also
 List of Railway Stations in Japan

References

External links

Railway stations in Kōchi Prefecture
Railway stations in Japan opened in 1963
Kuroshio, Kōchi